Matsieng Air Strip is a general aviation airfield near Rasesa,  north of Gaborone, Botswana. It was built in 2011. The airfield has been the venue for several international air shows.

Accidents and incidents
 On 23 March 2019, a Beechcraft B200 King Air was, reportedly intentionally, flown into the control tower and an adjacent building housing the local flying club after several low-altitude passes. An evacuation had been ordered before the crash and the pilot, who was the sole occupant of the aircraft, was the only person killed; both the control tower and the club building were destroyed.

See also

Transport in Botswana
List of airports in Botswana

References

External links 
2016 Air Show - YouTube

Airports in Botswana